Halvor Blinderen (16 June 1733 – 29 June 1804) was a Norwegian farmer noted for his progressive cultivation of  plants.

Halvor Haagensen Blinderen was born at Aker in Akershus  at the family farm Nedre Blindern gård.  Blindern developed the farm as a model for new operating methods of agriculture. He experimented with different crops and  fruit cultivation   He experimented with apricot, cherry trees and garden vegetables as well as beekeeping. He is most associated with his production of large quantities of potatoes.

The square Halvor Blinderns plass in Oslo is named after him, and a marble bust of him was erected on  Blindernveien in St. Hanshaugen in Oslo. The Main Building at Nedre Blindern has served as a rectory since 1856 and from 2000 the residence of the Bishop of Oslo.

See also
Blindern

References

External links
Blindern gård
Halvor Blindern's gravesite

1733 births
1804 deaths
Scientists from Oslo
Norwegian farmers
18th-century Norwegian botanists